Cyperus oblongoincrassatus is a species of sedge that is found in Kenya and Tanzania in eastern Africa.

The species was first formally described by the botanist Georg Kükenthal in 1936.

See also
 List of Cyperus species

References

oblongoincrassatus
Plants described in 1936
Flora of Tanzania
Flora of Kenya
Taxa named by Georg Kükenthal